Charles and Diana: Unhappily Ever After is a dramatic television movie of 1992 telling the real-life story of the failed marriage of Charles, Prince of Wales, and his first wife, Diana, Princess of Wales.

Directed by John Power and released in December 1992, the film stars Catherine Oxenberg as Diana, Roger Rees as Charles, and Jane How as Camilla Parker Bowles.

The film was released on DVD in November 2004. One issue of it was retitled Charles & Diana: A Palace Divided.

Background and production
The film followed on the heels of revelations published in May 1992 in Andrew Morton's book Diana: Her True Story. The executive producers were Frank Konigsberg and Larry Sanitsky, who had previously worked together on Surviving: A Family in Crisis (1985) and Act of Vengeance (1986). They went on to produce Oldest Living Confederate Widow Tells All (1994) and Titanic (1996) together.

Oxenberg, who played Diana, is a daughter of Princess Elizabeth of Yugoslavia and a third cousin of Charles.  She had played the part of Diana once before, in The Royal Romance of Charles and Diana (1982).

Oxenberg commented on playing Diana again: 

Gladys Crosbie was also repeating her part, having played Queen Elizabeth The Queen Mother in Britannia Hospital (1982), and was considered to be a "dead ringer" for Her Majesty.

ABC's first airing of the film on US television was on 13 December 1992, and was well-timed, coming four days after British prime minister John Major had announced in the House of Commons the "amicable separation" of Charles and Diana.

Synopsis
The film begins in the early days of the marriage of Charles and Diana, when they appear to be fond of each other and even in love. However, early scenes show them to have very different characters and interests. Charles is shown as intellectual and fastidious, a lover of opera, whereas Diana wants romance and is bored by opera. Also, the spectre of Charles's former mistress Camilla Parker Bowles intrudes into the marriage from the beginning. Within two months of their wedding, Diana accuses Charles to his face of being in love with Camilla. A series of tribulations and infidelities is eventually shared with the world through newspaper reports. The couple ends up estranged and indifferent to each other, but still connected through two young sons, William, now aged ten, and Harry, eight.

Cast
Catherine Oxenberg as Diana, Princess of Wales
Roger Rees as Charles, Prince of Wales
Jane How as Camilla Parker Bowles
Amanda Walker as Queen Elizabeth II
David Quilter as Prince Philip, Duke of Edinburgh
Benedict Taylor as Prince Andrew, Duke of York
Tracy Brabin as Sarah, Duchess of York
Gladys Crosbie as Queen Elizabeth The Queen Mother
Cate Fowler as Princess Anne
Alan Manson as Mark Phillips
Ernest Blake as Robert Fellowes, Baron Fellowes
Charles Collingwood as Martin
Thomas Szekeres as Prince William
Oliver Stone as Prince Harry
Mark Aiken as Nick
Christopher Owen as Doctor
David Glover as Director of Clinic
Patrick Pearson as Palmer
Ron Peterson as Palace Chef
Charles Jamieson as Builder
Keith Hutcheon as Hairdresser
Jeffrey Daunton as Footman
Richard Hampton as Architect
Aline Hay as Hostess
Vivienne Dixon as House Guest

Reception
Variety found the film "good-looking but unsatisfying" and commented that the fractured relationship of Charles and Diana was "punctuated by moments so melodramatic they would make Barbara Cartland groan". It considered that Rees had failed to convey Charles's eccentricity and that Oxenberg's Diana was too constantly about to snap, lacking Diana's earlier girlishness and her later elegance.

Notes

External links
 
Charles and Diana: Unhappily Ever After at FilmAffinity

1992 films
1992 romantic drama films
Films about couples
Films set in country houses
Films set in the 1980s
1990s English-language films
Films directed by John Power